Smith Nunataks are two nunataks close together, lying 5 nautical miles (9 km) north-northeast of Whitmill Nunatak in the northwest part of Grossman Nunataks, Palmer Land. Mapped by United States Geological Survey (USGS) from surveys and U.S. Navy aerial photographs, 1961–68, and Landsat imagery, 1973–74. Named in 1987 by Advisory Committee on Antarctic Names (US-ACAN) after Thomas T. Smith, USGS cartographer, a member of the field party on Byrd Glacier and Darwin Glacier, 1978–79.

Nunataks of Palmer Land